The Withers Stakes is a Grade III American Thoroughbred horse race for three years old horses over the distance of  miles on the dirt scheduled annually in February at Aqueduct Racetrack in Queens, New York. The event currently carries a purse of $250,000.

History
The Withers was named for David Dunham Withers (1821–1892), an important owner/breeder who won this race in 1890 with his colt, King Eric.

The inaugural run of the Withers Stakes occurred in 1874 at Jerome Park Racetrack. It was raced there through 1889 after which it was hosted by the Morris Park Racecourse from 1890 through 1904, then Jamaica Race Course in 1956, and at Belmont Park from 1957 through 1959 and 1984 through 1996.  The Withers was not run in 1911 and 1912 due to a New York State legislated ban on all forms of wagering on horses.  It was also not run in 2011, but returned to the New York racing calendar on February 4, 2012.

The Withers was historically run at a distance of one mile but was lengthened to  miles in 2012. In 1956, it was also contested at a mile and a sixteenth. The "Withers Mile", as it was known to racetrackers, was once one of America's great races, on par with events like England's St James's Palace Stakes and France's Prix Jacques Le Marois. Winners included outstanding sires like Dr. Fager, Jaipur, Hagley, Bold Reasoning, Hill Prince, Polynesian, Menow, and Blue Larkspur. In 1919, Sir Barton won the Kentucky Derby and Preakness Stakes, then won the Withers before winning the Belmont Stakes to complete the Triple Crown. Count Fleet repeated this feat in 1943. Other famous winners of the race include Man o' War and Native Dancer.

Prior to 2012, it was run in May at Belmont Park.

The Withers is a prep race on the Road to the Kentucky Derby. 

In 2018 the distance of the event was increased to  miles.

Records
Speed record:
  miles – 1:50.27  Tax (2019)
  miles – 1:43.93 Far From Over (2015)
 1 mile – 1:32.40 Williamstown (1993)

Most wins by a jockey:
 6 – Eddie Arcaro (1940, 1946, 1949, 1950, 1951, 1955)

Most wins by a trainer:
 5 – James G. Rowe Sr. (1883, 1884, 1904, 1908, 1909)

Most wins by an owner:
 5 – James R. Keene (1879, 1892, 1904, 1908, 1909)

Winners

* † In 1969, Gleaming Light finished first, but was disqualified and set back to fifth.

See also
Road to the Kentucky Derby
List of American and Canadian Graded races

References

External links
May 22, 1910 New York Times article on the 1910 Withers Stakes at Belmont Park

1874 establishments in New York (state)
Horse races in New York (state)
Aqueduct Racetrack
Jamaica Race Course
Flat horse races for three-year-olds
Graded stakes races in the United States
Grade 3 stakes races in the United States
Recurring sporting events established in 1874